Manuel Francisco Ayau Cordón (December 27, 1925 – August 4, 2010) was the Founder of the Universidad Francisco Marroquín in Guatemala. He was born in Guatemala City, on December 27, 1925. After diverse studies, he obtained a B.S. in Mechanical Engineering from Louisiana State University in 1950, an L.H.D. from Hillsdale College in 1973, and an honorary degree in law (Legum Doctor) from Northwood University in 1994.

Scholarly and Laboral Contributions
His many entrepreneurial activities include that of CEO of "Samboro, S.A.",  a company dedicated to the production of ceramic tiles; and of directing a group of Guatemalan industrialists for over forty years in the production of industrial gases and hydro-electric energy.  Dr. Ayau has also served on the board of directors of several different companies, including IBM in Latin America and the Guatemalan local stock and debt exchange, of which he was founding President.

In 1959 he also founded the Center for Economic and Social Studies (CEES) in Guatemala, to analyze the fundaments and philosophy of free society.  In 1972 he was instrumental in founding the Francisco Marroquín University, of which he was the first President until 1988.

A member of the Mont Pelerin Society since 1964, he was its President from 1978 to 1980.  He was on the board of directors of the Liberty Fund in Indianapolis and he was also a trustee of the Foundation for Economic Education in New York. He was also a member of the Philadelphia Society.

In Guatemala,  Dr. Ayau entered politics as a member of congress from 1970 to 1974, and as presidential candidate in the 1990 elections.

Twice he has formed part of the Central Bank council and has been president of two different commercial banks, Vice-President of the National Electrification Institute (INDE), trustee of the Philadelphia Society, and Honorary Member of the engineering society "Tau Beta Pi".

His last contribution to Guatemala was as President of Asociacion Civil proReforma del Estado de Guatemala.

In 2004 he was awarded by the Mont Pelerin Society for his contributions to freedom. Manuel Ayau obtained the Adam Smith Award, from the Association of Private Enterprise Education in 2005.  He obtained the Juan de Mariana Award, from the Instituto Juan de Mariana, in Spain, in 2008.  That year, at the Universidad Peruana de Ciencias Applicadas, he was appointed Honorary Professor.

Works
Among his most important works are "Como Mejorar el Nivel de Vida", "De Robinson a Viernes", "El Comercio", "La Década Perdida", "El Proceso Económico", "No Tenemos que Seguir Siendo Pobres para Siempre" and "Un Juego que no suma cero". He has been published widely in Guatemala and Latin America, as well as in the US, including in "Vision", "The Wall Street Journal", and "The Freeman".

Liberty Fund podcast from 2001, [A Conversation with Manuel Ayau] Ayau, The Intellectual Portrait Series: A Conversation with Manuel Ayau ToC: The Online Library of Liberty

Conferences
Conference by Dr. Manuel F. Ayau, Lic. Juan Carlos Simons, Lic. Alejandro Baldizón, Licda. Carroll Ríos de Rodríguez., ""Without a Solid and Strong State of Rights We will Never Build a Prosperous Nation"" at Francisco Marroquin University. Guatemala, December 2007

"El Proceso Económico por el Dr. Manuel F. Ayau"" at Francisco Marroquin University. Guatemala, October 2004

"Discussion on El Proceso Económico""

"Difundiendo las ideas liberales"" at Francisco Marroquin University. Guatemala, January 2009

"Cómo mejorar el nivel de vida – Manuel F. Ayau"" at Francisco Marroquin University.

"International Commerce – animated video"" at Francisco Marroquin University. Guatemala, April 2012

More conferences and content from Manuel F. Ayau of Universidad Francisco Marroquín: Manuel F. Ayau | New Media New Media

References

External links
 Biografía Manuel F. Ayau Cordón Rector Emerito Universidad Francisco Marroquín
 Asociacion ProReforma
 Latin Business Chronicle Manuel Ayau: LatAm Champion of Free Markets

Guatemalan businesspeople
1925 births
2010 deaths
Hillsdale College alumni
Louisiana State University alumni
Northwood University alumni
People associated with the Universidad Francisco Marroquín
Guatemalan expatriates in the United States